The fire-tailed sunbird (Aethopyga ignicauda) is a species of sunbird in the family Nectariniidae.

It is found in the northern parts of the Indian subcontinent, primarily in the Himalayas, and also in some adjoining regions in Southeast Asia.  The species occurs in Bangladesh, Bhutan, India, Myanmar, Nepal, Thailand and Tibet.

Its natural habitats are temperate forests and subtropical or tropical moist montane forests.
Males reach a length of 15 cm. including their long tail; females are about two-thirds that length. They live in conifer forests at altitudes up to 4,000 meters, descending into the valleys during the cold season. They eat insects, and also nectar. Both parents take part in feeding the young.

Gallery

References

fire-tailed sunbird
Birds of Bhutan
Birds of Northeast India
Birds of Nepal
Birds of Myanmar
Birds of Tibet
Birds of Yunnan
fire-tailed sunbird
Taxonomy articles created by Polbot